Spondias pinnata, sometimes also known as hog plum, is a species of tree with edible sour fruits. It is native to the Philippines and Indonesia, but has been widely naturalized in South Asia, Mainland Southeast Asia, Southern China, and the Solomon Islands. It belongs to the family Anacardiaceae. This species, among several others, has sometimes called the "wild (or forest) mango" in other languages and was once placed in the genus Mangifera.

Description 

The inflorescence is paniculate, terminal,  and glabrous, with basal first order branches . The flowers are mostly sessile and small, white and glabrous; calyx lobes are triangular, approx. .

The fruit is a drupe ellipsoid to elliptic-ovoid, olive green becoming yellowish orange at maturity,  × ; inner part of endocarp woody and grooved, outer part fibrous; mature fruit usually have 2 or 3 seeds. In China, it flowers from April–June and fruits from August–September.

Vernacular names 
Spondias pinnata may be called in:
Bahasa Indonesia: amra
Balinese: kacemcem
 (hwei or gwei)
 Chinese: , 
 
 Khmer /pɷːn siː pʰlaɛ/ or /məkaʔ prẹj/,
 Javanese (and Malay, Sundanese): kedondong (also for Spondias dulcis), kloncing
 Kannada: 
 Tamil:  (meaning "sour fruit"); in Sri Lanka it is also called , although this more commonly refers to Spondias dulcis
 ,  (eponym of the Thai capital Bangkok)
 Tulu and Konkani: 
 Vietnamese:  ('forest [mango-type fruit]')
Assamese language: 
Malayalam: 
Bengali: 
Odia: 
Lhotshamkha (Bhutan): Amara
Nepali language: Lapsi

Uses
The fruits have a sour taste and can be eaten raw or made into jams, jellies, or juices. They can also be used as feed for pigs (hence the common name "hog plum").

In the Philippines,  leaves and fruits are used as a souring agent in various native dishes like sinigang, sinanglay, or laing.

In India,  pickle is made using quartered  fruits preserved in mustard oil, salt, and spices. Along with mango and chili pepper pickle, it is the most common type of pickle found in households in many parts of India.

Gallery
Spondias pinnata specimens from Kerala, India:

References

pinnata
Flora of tropical Asia